Steven Scott Siler (born February 15, 1987) is an American mixed martial artist currently competing in the Featherweight division of the Professional Fighters League. A professional competitor since 2005, he has competed for the UFC, Titan FC, Tachi Palace Fights, and was a competitor on Spike TV's The Ultimate Fighter: Team Bisping vs. Team Miller.

Background
Born in Anaheim, Siler moved to Utah from a young age alongside his father Michael Siler Sr., mother Cathy Siler, brother Michael Siler Jr and sister Tara Siler. Siler was unable to compete in wrestling during high school due to poor grades, but made the move to MMA after graduating.

Mixed martial arts career
Siler had a nine-fight winning streak with wins over Bellator veterans, Travis Marx and Nick Mamalis. Siler then accepted a bout with future UFC featherweight title challenger, Chad Mendes, at Tachi Palace Fights: Best of Both Worlds. Siler lost the fight inside the first minute of round one via KO.

Siler returned Throwdown MMA, claiming the featherweight title after beating Enoch Wilson. Siler won three more fights after winning the Throwdown title before challenging Cole Escovedo at Showdown Fights: New Blood. Siler lost the fight via submission (triangle choke) in the first round.

The Ultimate Fighter
In 2011, Siler signed to compete on The Ultimate Fighter: Team Bisping vs. Team Miller. In the first episode, Siler gained entry into the house after defeating Micah Miller via submission at 0:53 of the third round. Siler was picked to be part of Team Miller. In the sixth episode, he did not make the semi-finals, as he lost to Diego Brandao via KO due to a flying knee 30 seconds into the first round.

Ultimate Fighting Championship
Despite being eliminated from the TUF season, Siler was signed to a contract with the UFC. Siler was originally scheduled to fight Akira Corassani on December 3, 2011, at The Ultimate Fighter 14 Finale. However, Corassani was forced out with an injury and replaced by Josh Clopton. Siler defeated Clopton via unanimous decision.

Siler next faced Cole Miller at UFC on FX 2 on March 2, 2012. Siler won the fight via unanimous decision (29–28, 29–28, 29–28).

Siler was expected to face Jimy Hettes at UFC on FX 4. However, Hettes was forced out of the bout with an injury and Siler instead faced UFC newcomer Joey Gambino. He won the fight via submission in the first round.

Siler lost a unanimous decision to Darren Elkins on November 17, 2012, at UFC 154.

Siler was again expected to face Jimy Hettes on April 27, 2013, at UFC 159. However, Hettes was once again forced out of the bout with an injury and replaced by Kurt Holobaugh. Siler won the back-and-forth bout via unanimous decision.

Replacing Akira Corassani on short notice, Siler faced Mike Brown on August 17, 2013, at UFC Fight Night 26. He won the fight via knockout just 50 seconds into the first round.

Siler faced Dennis Bermudez on November 6, 2013, at UFC Fight Night 31. He lost the fight via unanimous decision.

Siler faced Rony Jason on March 23, 2014, at UFC Fight Night 38. He lost the fight via a controversial TKO stoppage in the first round. Siler was initially dropped by two punches from Jason. Siler, having his back on the mat, immediately throw an up-kick as soon as Rony proceeded to walk toward him. At the very same time the referee stepped in to stop the fight as a conscious Siler was attempting to defend himself.

Siler faced Noad Lahat on July 26, 2014, at UFC on Fox 12. He lost the fight via unanimous decision, and was subsequently released from the promotions shortly after.

Titan Fighting Championship
In October 2014, it was announced that Siler had signed a contract with Titan Fighting Championship. After Desmond Green knocked out Miguel Torres, it was announced that Siler would face Green for the vacant Featherweight championship.  The fight took place at Titan FC 32 on December 19, 2014 and Siler lost via unanimous decision.

Professional Fighters League
After fighting in the WSOF, Siler faced Lance Palmer at what was the inaugural event of rebranded organization now known as Professional Fighters League on November 2, 2017. He lost the fight via unanimous decision.

2018 season
On April 16, 2018, news surfaced that Siler was set to participate in the inaugural season of Professional Fighters League's featherweight tournament. Simultaneously it was announced that Siler would be facing Magomed Idrisov at PFL 1 on June 7, 2018. After being knocked down, Siler won the fight via first-round submission.

Siler then faced Alexandre Almeida at PFL 4 on July 19, 2018. He won the fight via first-minute submission and advanced to playoffs.

In the quarterfinal, Siler faced Nazareno Malegarie at PFL 8 on October 5, 2018. The bout resulted in a majority draw and Siler advanced to the semifinal via first-round tiebreaker. In the semifinals he faced Alexandre Almeida again, this time winning via disqualification after an illegal upkick performed by Almeida.

In the season final Siler faced Lance Palmer in a rematch at PFL 11 on December 31, 2018. He lost the fight via unanimous decision.

2019 season
On March 5, 2019, it was announced that Siler would be returning to participate in the sophomore season of PFL. He made his first appearance of the season against Gadzhi Rabadanov at PFL 2 on May 23, 2019. He lost the fight via unanimous decision.

He then faced Jeremy Kennedy at PFL 5 on July 25, 2019. He lost the fight via unanimous decision and was eliminated from the tournament.

Post-PFL career
After two seasons in the PFL, Siler challenged Bobby King for the Fierce FC Lightweight Championship on February 27, 2021. He lost the fight via fourth-round submission.

Siler faced Will Brooks on July 30, 2021 at XMMA 2. He lost the bout via unanimous decision.

After defeating Carson Hardman at Fierce FC 16 on August 28, 2021 via first-round submission and then losing to Zach Zane at Fierce FC 17 on October 29, 2021 via seven-second knockout. Siler next faced Jakob Scheffel at Showtime FC 1 on February 11, 2022, where he lost the fight via unanimous decision.

Siler would return in April 2022, losing to Tsogookhuu Amarsanaa via unanimous decision, before losing once again against Micah Miller via second round triangle armbar on December 2, 2022 at iKON FC 6.

Mixed martial arts record

|-
|Loss
|align=center|33–26–1
|Micah Miller
|Submission (triangle armbar)
|iKON FC 6
|
|align=center|2
|align=center|1:47
|Kissimmee, Florida, United States
|
|-
|Loss
|align=center|33–25–1
|Tsogookhuu Amarsanaa
|Decision (unanimous)
|Fierce FC 19
|
|align=center|3
|align=center|5:00
|West Valley City, Utah, United States
|
|-
|Loss
|align=center|33–24–1
|Jakob Scheffel
|Decision (unanimous)
|Showtime FC 1
|
|align=center|3
|align=center|5:00
|Lakeland, Florida, United States
|
|-
|Loss
|align=center|33–23–1
|Zach Zane
|TKO (strikes)
|Fierce FC 17: Siler vs. Zane
|
|align=center|1
|align=center|0:07
|Salt Lake City, Utah, United States
|
|-
|Win
|align=center|33–22–1
|Carson Hardman
|Submission (rear-naked choke)
|Fierce FC 16: Siler vs. Hardman
|
|align=center|1
|align=center|4:37
|Salt Lake City, Utah, United States
|
|-
|Loss
|align=center|32–22–1
|Will Brooks
|Decision (unanimous)
|XMMA 2: Saunders vs. Nijem
|
|align=center|3
|align=center|5:00
|Greenville, South Carolina, United States
|
|-
|Loss
|align=center|32–21–1
|Bobby King
|Submission (armbar)
|Fierce FC: Will Power
|
|align=center|4
|align=center|0:57
|West Valley City, Utah, United States 
|
|-
|Loss
|align=center|32–20–1
|Jeremy Kennedy
|Decision (unanimous)
|PFL 5
|
|align=center|3
|align=center|5:00
|Atlantic City, New Jersey, United States 
|
|-
|Loss
|align=center|32–19–1
|Gadzhi Rabadanov
|Decision (unanimous)
|PFL 2
|
|align=center|3
|align=center|5:00
|Uniondale, New York, United States 
|
|- 
|Loss
|align=center|32–18–1
|Lance Palmer
|Decision (unanimous)
|PFL 11
|
|align=center|5
|align=center|5:00
|New York City, New York, United States 
|
|- 
|Win
|align=center|32–17–1
|Alexandre Almeida
|DQ (illegal upkick)
| rowspan=2|PFL 8
| rowspan=2|
|align=center|2
|align=center|0:52
| rowspan=2|New Orleans, Louisiana, United States
|
|-
|Draw
|align=center|
|Nazareno Malegarie
|Draw (majority) 
|align=center|2
|align=center|5:00
|
|-
|Win
|align=center|31–17
|Alexandre Almeida
|Technical submission (guillotine choke)
|PFL 4
|
|align=center| 1
|align=center| 0:35
|Uniondale, New York, United States 
| 
|-
| Win
| align=center| 30–17
|Magomed Idrisov
|Submission (triangle choke)
| PFL 1
|
|align=center|1
|align=center|4:19
|New York City, New York, United States
| 
|-
| Loss
| align=center| 29–17
|Lance Palmer
|Decision (unanimous)
|PFL: Fight Night
|
|align=center|3
|align=center|5:00
|Washington, D.C., United States
| 
|-
| Loss
| align=center| 29–16
|Hakeem Dawodu
|Decision (unanimous)
|WSOF 35
|
|align=center|3
|align=center|5:00
|Verona, New York, United States
| 
|-
|Win
|align=center| 29–15
|Patrick Reeves
|KO
|Jeremy Horn's Elite Fight Night 28
|
|align=center|1
|align=center|0:13
|Ogden, Utah, United States
| 
|-
| Loss
| align=center| 28–15
| Andre Harrison
| Decision (split)
| Titan FC 37
| 
| align=center| 5
| align=center| 5:00
| Ridgefield, Washington, United States
| 
|-
| Win
| align=center| 28–14
| Scott Thometz
|Decision (unanimous)
| Front Street Fights 7
| 
| align=center| 3
| align=center| 5:00
| Boise, Idaho, United States
|
|-
| Win
| align=center| 27–14
| Austin Springer
|Submission (guillotine choke)
| Titan FC 35
| 
| align=center|1
| align=center|1:04
| Ridgefield, Washington, United States
| 
|-
| Win
| align=center| 26–14
| Joshua Tyler
| Submission (rear-naked choke)
| Jeremy Horn's Elite Fight Night 27
| 
| align=center| 1
| align=center| 3:05
| Ogden, Utah, United States
|
|-
| Win
| align=center| 25–14
| Jack Montgomery
| TKO (punches)
| World Fighting Championships 41 
| 
| align=center| 1
| align=center| 2:32
| Reno, Nevada, United States
| 
|-
| Win
| align=center| 24–14
| Brandon Hempleman
| TKO (punches)
| Front Street Fights 4 
| 
| align=center| 1
| align=center| 2:45
| Boise, Idaho, United States
| 
|-
| Loss
| align=center| 23–14
| Desmond Green
| Decision (unanimous)
| Titan FC 32
| 
| align=center| 5
| align=center| 5:00
| Lowell, Massachusetts, United States
| 
|-
| Loss
| align=center|  23–13
| Noad Lahat
| Decision (unanimous)
| UFC on Fox: Lawler vs. Brown
| 
| align=center| 3
| align=center| 5:00
| San Jose, California, United States
| 
|-
| Loss
| align=center|  23–12
| Rony Jason
| TKO (punches)
| UFC Fight Night: Shogun vs. Henderson 2
|  
| align=center|  1
| align=center|  1:17
| Natal, Brazil
| 
|-
| Loss
| align=center|  23–11
| Dennis Bermudez
| Decision (unanimous)
| UFC: Fight for the Troops 3
| 
| align=center|  3
| align=center|  5:00
| Fort Campbell, Kentucky, United States
| 
|-
| Win
| align=center|  23–10
| Mike Brown
| KO (punches)
| UFC Fight Night: Shogun vs. Sonnen
| 
| align=center|  1
| align=center|  0:50
| Boston, Massachusetts, United States
| 
|-
| Win
| align=center|  22–10
| Kurt Holobaugh
| Decision (unanimous)
| UFC 159
| 
| align=center|  3
| align=center|  5:00
| Newark, New Jersey, United States
| 
|-
| Loss
| align=center|  21–10
| Darren Elkins
| Decision (unanimous)
| UFC 154
| 
| align=center|  3
| align=center|  5:00
| Montreal, Quebec, Canada
| 
|-
| Win
| align=center|  21–9
| Joey Gambino
| Submission (guillotine choke)
| UFC on FX: Maynard vs. Guida
| 
| align=center|  1
| align=center|  2:47
| Atlantic City, New Jersey, United States
| 
|-
| Win
| align=center|  20–9
| Cole Miller
| Decision (unanimous)
| UFC on FX: Alves vs. Kampmann
| 
| align=center|  3
| align=center|  5:00
| Sydney, Australia
| 
|-
| Win
| align=center|  19–9
| Josh Clopton
| Decision (unanimous)
| The Ultimate Fighter 14 Finale
| 
| align=center|  3
| align=center|  5:00
| Las Vegas, Nevada, United States
| 
|-
| Loss
| align=center|  18–9
| Cole Escovedo
| Submission (triangle choke)
| Showdown Fights: New Blood
| 
| align=center|  1
| align=center|  2:30
| Orem, Utah, United States
| 
|-
| Win
| align=center|  18–8
| Steve Sharp
| Submission (guillotine choke)
| WCFC: World Championship Full Contact
| 
| align=center|  1
| align=center|  0:45
| Salt Lake City, Utah, United States
| 
|-
| Win
| align=center|  17–8
| Dennis Davis
| Submission (triangle choke)
| Showdown Fights: Respect
| 
| align=center|  1
| align=center|  1:22
| Orem, Utah, United States
| 
|-
| Win
| align=center|  16–8
| James Francis
| Submission (guillotine choke)
| WCFC: The Beginning
| 
| align=center|  1
| align=center|  0:21
| Ogden, Utah, United States
| 
|-
| Win
| align=center|  15–8
| Enoch Wilson
| Decision (unanimous)
| Throwdown Showdown 5: Homecoming
| 
| align=center|  5
| align=center|  5:00
| Orem, Utah, United States
| 
|-
| Loss
| align=center|  14–8
| Chad Mendes
| KO (punches)
| TPF: Best of Both Worlds
| 
| align=center|  1
| align=center|  0:44
| Lemoore, California, United States
| 
|-
| Win
| align=center|  14–7
| Shawn Bias
| Submission (guillotine choke)
| Throwdown Showdown 4: Cuatro
| 
| align=center|  1
| align=center|  3:15
| West Valley City, Utah, United States
| 
|-
| Win
| align=center|  13–7
| Nick Mamalis
| Submission (guillotine choke)
| Throwdown Showdown 3: Big Time
| 
| align=center|  1
| align=center|  1:25
| Salt Lake City, Utah, United States
| 
|-
| Win
| align=center|  12–7
| Camrann Pacheco
| Submission (rear-naked choke)
| Throwdown Showdown 2: The Return
| 
| align=center|  1
| align=center|  2:29
| Orem, Utah, United States
| 
|-
| Win
| align=center|  11–7
| Olly Bradstreet
| Submission (guillotine choke)
| Total Mayhem 2
| 
| align=center|  1
| align=center|  3:47
| Ogden, Utah, United States
| 
|-
| Win
| align=center|  10–7
| Travis Marx
| Submission (triangle choke)
| Jeremy Horn's Elite Fight Night 2
| 
| align=center|  2
| align=center|  3:35
| Salt Lake City, Utah, United States
| 
|-
| Win
| align=center|  9–7
| Dan Berry
| Submission
| UCE: Round 30: Episode 11
| 
| align=center|  1
| align=center|  1:27
| Salt Lake City, Utah, United States
| 
|-
| Win
| align=center|  8–7
| Mikael Smith
| TKO (punches)
| Bush Cree Promotions
| 
| align=center|  2
| align=center|  0:12
| Grand Junction, Colorado, United States
| 
|-
| Win
| align=center|  7–7
| John Sharp
| Submission (rear-naked choke)
| Cage Fighting Championship 3
| 
| align=center|  1
| align=center|  1:47
| Ogden, Utah, United States
| 
|-
| Win
| align=center|  6–7
| Lance Gorman
| Submission (rear-naked choke)
| UCE: Round 26: Episode 13
| 
| align=center|  2
| align=center|  1:43
| Tooele, Utah, United States
| 
|-
| Loss
| align=center|  5–7
| Olly Bradstreet
| Submission (guillotine choke)
| UCE: Round 26: Finals
| 
| align=center|  2
| align=center|  1:50
| St. George, Utah, United States
| 
|-
| Win
| align=center|  5–6
| Travis Worenscroft
| Submission (rear-naked choke)
| UCE: Round 26: Episode 9 Day 1
| 
| align=center|  1
| align=center|  1:50
| Salt Lake City, Utah, United States
| 
|-
| Loss
| align=center|  4–6
| Matt May
| TKO (punches)
| XFS 5: Heavy Hitters
| 
| align=center|  4
| align=center|  2:27
| Boise, Idaho, United States
| 
|-
| Loss
| align=center|  4–5
| Dwayne Shelton
| Submission (rear-naked choke)
| Combat Sports Challenge
| 
| align=center|  1
| align=center|  3:14
| Richmond, Virginia, United States
| 
|-
| Win
| align=center|  4–4
| Matthew Rider
| TKO (strikes)
| UCE: Round 25: Episode 9 Day 1
| 
| align=center|  1
| align=center|  2:26
| West Jordan, Utah, United States
| 
|-
| Loss
| align=center|  3–4
| Olly Bradstreet
| Submission (rear-naked choke)
| UCE: Round 23: Finals
| 
| align=center|  1
| align=center|  3:07
| West Valley City, Utah, United States
| 
|-
| Win
| align=center|  3–3
| Kawaika Kauwe
| Decision (split)
| UCE: Round 23: Episode 6 Day 1
| 
| align=center|  3
| align=center|  3:00
| West Jordan, Utah, United States
| 
|-
| Loss
| align=center|  2–3
| Kawaika Kauwe
| TKO (injury)
| UCE: Round 22: Episode 2
| 
| align=center|  2
| align=center|  0:45
| Tooele, Utah, United States
| 
|-
| Loss
| align=center|  2–2
| Kawaika Kauwe
| Technical Submission (guillotine choke)
| UCE: Round 21: Underage Show
| 
| align=center|  1
| align=center|  1:54
| Salt Lake City, Utah, United States
| 
|-
| Win
| align=center|  2–1
| Jared Garn
| Decision (split)
| UCE: Round 20: Episode 7
| 
| align=center|  3
| align=center|  3:00
| West Jordan, Utah, United States
| 
|-
| Loss
| align=center|  1–1
| Olly Bradstreet
| TKO (punches)
| UCE: Round 18: Episode 5 Day 1
| 
| align=center|  1
| align=center|  2:03
| Salt Lake City, Utah, United States
| 
|-
| Win
| align=center|  1–0
| Samuel Hewitt
| Decision (split)
| UCE: Round 14: Finals
| 
| align=center|  3
| align=center|  3:00
| West Valley City, Utah, United States
|

References

External links
 
 

1987 births
Living people
American male mixed martial artists
Featherweight mixed martial artists
Mixed martial artists utilizing wrestling
People from Anaheim, California
Ultimate Fighting Championship male fighters